The enzyme 5-phytase (EC 3.1.3.72) catalyzes the reaction

myo-inositol hexakisphosphate + H2O = 1L-myo-inositol 1,2,3,4,6-pentakisphosphate + phosphate

myo-Inositol hexakisphosphate is also known as phytic acid.

These enzymes belongs to the family of hydrolases, specifically those acting on phosphoric monoester bonds.  The systematic name of this enzyme class is myo-inositol-hexakisphosphate 5-phosphohydrolase.

Prevalence

Of the hundreds of phytase enzymes that have been characterized in the literature, only two have been characterized as 5-phytases. A histidine acid phosphatases purified from lily pollen and a protein tyrosine phosphatase-like phytase from Selenomonas ruminantium subsp. lactilytica were both found to have specificity for the 5-phosphate position of myo-inositol hexakisphosphate.

Structural studies

See also 

 3-phytase (1-phytase)
 4-phytase (6-phytase)
 Protein tyrosine phosphatase

References

EC 3.1.3
Enzymes of known structure